Greencroft is a village in County Durham, England. The population of the civil parish (which doesn't include the village) taken at the 2011 census was 171. It is situated between Lanchester and Annfield Plain.

References

External links

Villages in County Durham
Stanley, County Durham